Avgust Karlovich Tsivolko, also spelled as Tsivolka (1810 – March 28 (O.S. March 16), 1839) was a Russian navigator and Arctic explorer.

In 1834–1835, Avgust Tsivolko took part in the Pakhtusov expedition towards Novaya Zemlya. In 1837, Tsivolko commanded a schooner named Krotov during the Baer expedition towards Novaya Zemlya. He was the one to map the Matochkin Strait in the course of this expedition. In 1838 Tsivolko was put in charge of the mapping expedition and sent towards the northern and northeastern shores of Novaya Zemlya.

Avgust Tsivolko died of scurvy during this expedition.

A gulf in the Kara Sea and a group of islands in the Nordenskiöld Archipelago are named after Avgust Tsivolko.

1810 births
1839 deaths
Explorers of the Arctic
Russian and Soviet polar explorers
Explorers from the Russian Empire
Deaths from scurvy
19th-century people from the Russian Empire